Whistlestop Valley, formerly the Kirklees Light Railway, is a visitor attraction featuring a  long  gauge minimum gauge railway.  The attraction's main site is in the village of Clayton West in Kirklees, West Yorkshire, England which was first opened to the public on 19 October 1991, with a second, smaller site in a rural area near the village of Shelley.

The railway at Whistlestop Valley runs along the trackbed of the Lancashire & Yorkshire Railway's former branch line, from Clayton West via Skelmanthorpe to Shelley Woodhouse (a few yards close to the former Clayton West Junction , near ) on the Penistone line from Huddersfield to Sheffield via Penistone and Barnsley.

From 1991 to 2021 the attraction was known as the Kirklees Light Railway. In June 2021, the attraction rebranded under the name Whistlestop Valley but retains the name Kirklees Light Railway for its 15 inch railway operation.

History
The branch line was built with bridges, tunnels and earthworks suitable for a double line in case of a proposed extension to reach Darton on the Dewsbury to Barnsley Line, but only one line was ever laid and despite attempts to extend the railway, Clayton West was to remain as a terminus.

The line survived the Beeching cuts in large part thanks to the mineral traffic generated by the collieries at the terminus (Park Mill) and at Skelmanthorpe (Emley Moor), but was not adopted by the  West Yorkshire Passenger Transport Executive unlike nearly all other passenger lines in West Yorkshire and was closed to passengers on 24 January 1983. Coal was still transhipped from Emley Moor Colliery to Elland Power Station until 1984 and tracklifting of the branch was completed in 1986.

Construction of the minimum gauge railway started in mid-summer 1990, following a joint application for a Light Railway Order between Kirklees Council and the Kirklees Light Railway Company on 22 February 1989. Construction was aided significantly by the amount of redundant materials available from a number of collieries in the area which were slowly beginning to end their mining operations. The Light Railway Order was finally granted on 27 September 1991.

The line was originally  in length running from Clayton West to a specially constructed halt called Cuckoos Nest. This name is historic to 15 inch gauge railways as a station on the Eaton Hall Railway, near Chester, built by Arthur Heywood bore the name. Trains to Cuckoo's Nest commenced running on Saturday 19 October 1991. The KLR was later extended to Skelmanthorpe in 1992 and again to Shelley Woodhouse in 1996/97 with a grant from ERDF for the regeneration of coal mining areas.

Operations 
The attraction is usually closed during January for winter maintenance.  The attraction is open to the public on most weekends, bank holidays and daily during local school holidays from February to November. Winter opening is usually Christmas themed with options including Santa Special trains (involving train rides and an encounter with Santa Claus).

Stations
Clayton West
Cuckoos Nest halt
Skelmanthorpe
Shelley Woodhouse

Locomotives
Many of the locomotives used on the railway were built by the railway's founder Brian Taylor, with subsequent application of modern steam principles advocated by Livio Dante Porta. These modifications have improved the locomotives' performance, reliability and efficiency. The line has also acquired some older locomotives, constructed by Guest Engineering.

Steam locomotives
The following are approximately half size narrow gauge locomotives:

Diesel locomotive
 Jay built in 1992, and was constructed around a 1947 vintage Dorman 2DL engine that had previously been used in one of the famous Hudswell Clarke steam outline locomotives used on the Pleasure Beach Express at Blackpool Pleasure Beach. In 2002 the locomotive was rebuilt with a slightly different body outline, and the engine was replaced with a Ford 4D 4-cylinder diesel engine. In 2008 the locomotive received a further engine changed when it was fitted with a new Kubota 4-cylinder engine, its first new engine since it was built. Jay is probably the hardest-working engine on the line, as it is used a lot to shunt stock; it is also used occasionally on passenger trains.

Petrol locomotive
No 7 The Tram built in 1991. This locomotive was originally constructed was a 2w-2PH platelayers' trolley. It was subsequently fitted with a steam outline body based on the J70 tram engines built by the Great Eastern Railway. It was originally fitted with an engine from an invalid car, though at the present, June 2009, a new small Kubota diesel engine is due to be fitted. It is predominantly used at special events (mainly Day out with Thomas) giving rides to children.

Gallery

References

External links

Official website

15 in gauge railways in England
Heritage railways in Yorkshire
Transport in Kirklees
Tourist attractions in Kirklees